The 1964 Calgary Stampeders finished in 2nd place in the Western Conference with a 12–4 record. They were defeated in the Western Finals by the BC Lions.

Regular season

Season standings

Season schedule

Playoffs

Cenference Semi-Finals

 Calgary won the total-point series by 76–40. The Stampeders will play the BC Lions in the Western Finals.

Conference finals

 BC wins the best of three series 2–1. The Lions will advance to the Grey Cup Championship game.

Awards and records

1964 CFL All-Stars

References

Calgary Stampeders seasons
1964 Canadian Football League season by team